The Chosen Few is the second studio album by American hip hop collective Boot Camp Clik. It was released on October 8, 2002 through Duck Down Music, making it the first album released from the group or any affiliate since 1999. Production was handled by Da Beatminerz, Eric "Coptic" Matlock, Curt Cazal, Dan the Man, Drew "Dru-Ha" Friedman, Alchemist, Bink!, Hi-Tek, Producers Coalition of America and TY Deals. The album features contributions from seven of the eight original members with Heltah Skeltah's Rock being the only absent member, as well as guest appearances from Jahdan Blakkamoore, Illa Noyz, Rufus Blaq, Scratch and Supreme.

The effort received very strong reviews, and the singles "And So" and "Think Back" received moderate video play. The Chosen Few was the first Boot Camp album released on an independent label, with sales reaching just over 60,000 copies in the United States.

Track listing

Notes
Track 10 features additional vocals by Little Cook WTW2 and Queenia
Track 11 features additional vocals by Danielle Henry

Sample credits
Track 14 contains elements from "Tomorrow I May Not Feel the Same" written by Eugene Dixon and Lena Thompson and performed by Gene Chandler

Charts

References

External links

2002 albums
Boot Camp Clik albums
Duck Down Music albums
Albums produced by Hi-Tek
Albums produced by Da Beatminerz
Albums produced by Bink (record producer)
Albums produced by the Alchemist (musician)